Rhys Mechyll (died 1244) was a Welsh prince of the House of Dinefwr, ruler of part of the kingdom of Deheubarth in southern Wales from 1234 to 1244. He was a son of Rhys Gryg (died 1234) ("Rhys the Hoarse"), son of Rhys ap Gruffydd (1132–1197), "The Lord Rhys", ruler of the kingdom of Deheubarth.

Marriage
He married Matilda de Braose (died 1248) who betrayed the dynasty's chief castle of Carreg Cennen to the Anglo-Normans in 1248, against the interests of her son Rhys. A Welsh chronicle, the Brut y Tywysogyon, records under the year 1248: "Rhys Fychan ap Rhys Mechyll regained the castle of Carreg Cennen, which his mother had treacherously placed in the power of the French, out of enmity for her son."

Progeny
He had a son Rhys Fychan  (i.e. "The Younger") ap Rhys Mechyll, and a daughter Gwenllian, his eventual heiress who married Gilbert Talbot (died 1274), grandfather of Gilbert Talbot, 1st Baron Talbot (died 1345/6), to whom passed the ancient armorials of the House of Dinefwr, assumed as arms of alliance to a great princess in place of his own paternal arms.

Notes 
 Walker, David. Medieval Wales, Cambridge University Press, 1990, p. 98.

References 

Monarchs of Deheubarth
1244 deaths
Year of birth unknown
13th-century Welsh monarchs